In calculus, 
the racetrack principle describes the movement and growth of two functions in terms of their derivatives.

This principle is derived from the fact that if a horse named Frank Fleetfeet always runs faster than a horse named Greg Gooseleg, then if Frank and Greg start a race from the same place and the same time, then Frank will win.  More briefly, the horse that starts fast and stays fast wins.

In symbols: 
if  for all , and if , then  for all . 
or, substituting ≥ for > produces the theorem
if  for all , and if , then  for all . 
which can be proved in a similar way

Proof
This principle can be proven by considering the function h(x) = f(x) - g(x). If we were to take the derivative we would notice that for x>0

Also notice that h(0) = 0. Combining these observations, we can use the mean value theorem on the interval [0, x] and get

By assumption, so multiplying both sides by  gives f(x) - g(x) > 0. This implies f(x) > g(x).

Generalizations

The statement of the racetrack principle can slightly generalized as follows; 
if  for all , and if , then  for all .

as above, substituting ≥ for > produces the theorem 
if  for all , and if , then  for all .

Proof
This generalization can be proved from the racetrack principle as follows:

Application
The racetrack principle can be used to prove a lemma necessary to show that the exponential function grows faster than any power function. The lemma required is that

for all real . To see how it is used we consider the functions

and

Notice that  and that

because the exponential function is always increasing (monotonic) so . Thus by the racetrack principle . Thus,

for all .

References
 Deborah Hughes-Hallet, et al., Calculus.

Differential calculus
Mathematical principles